Esfandaqeh Rural District is a rural district (dehestan) in the Central District of Jiroft County, Kerman Province, Iran. At the 2006 census, its population was 7,224, in 1,549 families. The rural district has 52 villages.

References 

Rural Districts of Kerman Province
Jiroft County